= Shadow over Babylon =

1993 novel by David Mason

- First US edition
- Author: David Mason
- Language: English
- Genre: Thriller
- Publisher: Dutton Adult (US); Bloomsbury (UK)
- Publication date: January 1993
- Publication place: United Kingdom
- Media type: Print (hardback & paperback)
- Pages: 496
- ISBN: 0525937099
- OCLC: 978-0525937098

Shadow over Babylon is a novel by David Mason published in 1993 by Bloomsbury in the UK and by Dutton Adult in the US.

== Plot ==
The book's plot opens after the Gulf War when a government minister approached a British businessman to execute a plan to assassinate Saddam Hussein. The businessman recruits Sir Peter Dartington, the owner of the international construction company. The latter tasked the mission of preparing and executing the job to Security contractor Ed Howard, an ex-Royal Marines and SBS officer. Howard recruits his men at X.F Security firm, all of them are special forces veterans, including his best friend Mike Ziegler, former officer at the Navy SEALS. In addition, Howard is recruiting a Scottish hunting guide to serve as a sniper of the force. The assassination operation requires the team to deal with Iraqi military on the one hand and successfully evade the US and UK intelligence organizations on the other.

== Reception ==
The New York Times called it "absorbing" and "an unusually deft first novel" Kirkus Reviews stated that readers would "love the details of exactly what happens."
